Joseph N. "Smokey Joe" Salem (born May 1, 1938) is former American football player and coach. He served as the head football coach at the University of South Dakota (1966–1974), Northern Arizona University (1975–1978), and the University of Minnesota (1979–1983), compiling a career college football record of 96–91–3.  Salem was most recently the quarterbacks coach at Augustana College in Sioux Falls, South Dakota, a position he held from 2006 to 2009.

Head coaching record

References

External links
 Augustana profile

Living people
1938 births
Augustana (South Dakota) Vikings football coaches
Minnesota Golden Gophers football coaches
Minnesota Golden Gophers football players
Northern Arizona Lumberjacks football coaches
South Dakota Coyotes football coaches
Sportspeople from Sioux Falls, South Dakota
Players of American football from South Dakota